The Nikon D7000 is a 16.2-megapixel digital single-lens reflex camera (DSLR) model announced by Nikon on September 15, 2010. It replaced the D90 as the top end consumer camera, by using much of the technology and controls from the earlier D5000, in a larger more robust body similar to the flagship D300 series. In some ways it was superior to the D300S, though for several years the two cameras were both available with the D300 positioned as the flagship in Nikon marketing materials.

The D7000 offers numerous professional-style features over the D90, such as magnesium alloy body construction, weather and moisture sealing, a 2,016-segment color exposure meter, built-in timed interval exposure features, 39 rather than 11 focus points, dual SD memory card slots, virtual horizon (in live view and viewfinder) and compatibility with older non-CPU autofocus and manual-focus AI and AI-S Nikon F-mount lenses (including an electronic rangefinder with three-segment viewfinder manual focus indication) as well as tilt-shift PC-E lenses. Other built-in features are a wireless flash commander, two user-customizable modes, full HD video with autofocus and mono audio (With support for an external stereo microphone), automatic correction of lateral chromatic aberration and support for GPS and WLAN.

In 2011, the D7000 received four major awards, the Red Dot product design, TIPA's "Best D-SLR Advanced" category, EISA's "European Advanced SLR Camera 2011-2012" and the CameraGP Japan 2011 Readers Award.

The D7000 was superseded by the D7100, announced on February 20, 2013. However, Nikon kept the D7000 in its product lineup for at least several months.

Feature list
 Sony IMX071 16.2 megapixel CMOS sensor, Nikon DX format with a pixel size of 4.78 µm.
 Nikon EXPEED 2 image/video processor.
 Full HD 1080p (at 24 frame/s) movie mode with auto-focus while filming, mono sound, and stereo external mic support. (30 frame/s or 25 frame/s or 24 frame/s when recording at 720p)
 Automatic correction of lateral chromatic aberration for JPEGs. Correction-data is additionally stored in RAW-files and can be used by Nikon Capture NX, View NX and some other RAW tools.
 Enhanced built-in RAW processing with extended Retouch menu for image processing without using a computer.
 Active D-Lighting and Active D-Lighting bracketing; also D-Lighting which can be applied to a JPEG using an Image Editing feature in Playback mode; Nikon Capture NX and View software include tools for applying D-Lighting to NEF format photos.
 Two user-customisable modes
 Many WB options including WB Bracketing and two auto white balance modes, one of which maintaining warm lighting colours
 3-inch TFT LCD with 921,000-dot resolution (640x480 VGA) and 170-degree ultra-wide viewing angle with toughened glass screen
 Live View shooting mode (activated with a dedicated lever)
 Inbuilt time-lapse photography intervalometer
 Continuous Drive up to 6 frames per second for 100 JPEG frames (but not necessarily all at the same frame rate).
 Memory Buffer Capacity: Varies with image format, 10 image capacity in NEF (RAW) Lossless Compressed 14-bit format (Highest resolution available format) and can store up to 100 with JPEG.
 2,016-pixel RGB 3D Color Matrix Metering II with Scene Recognition System.
 3D Tracking Multi-CAM 4800DX autofocus sensor module with 39 AF points, including nine cross-type points.
 Face detection, Wide Area, Normal Area, and Subject Tracking autofocus options in live view mode.
 ISO sensitivity 100 to 6400 (up to 25600 with boost).
 Bracketing
 Dual SD memory card slots with support for SDXC cards, UHS-I bus, and Eye-Fi Wireless LAN
 Weather-resistant, sealed body that has Magnesium-alloy top and back panels.
 Built-in Sensor cleaning system
 Support for optional GPS unit direct connect.
 File formats: JPEG, NEF (Nikon's RAW, 12/14-bit also lossless compressed), MOV (H.264, PCM).
 EN-EL15 Lithium-ion Battery, Battery Life (shots per charge) approx. : 1,050 shots (CIPA).
 Lens compatibility: Nikkor F Mount, AF-S, AF-I, AF-D, Manual Nikkor AI/AIS (metering use built-in coupling on D7000)

Optional accessories
The Nikon D7000 has dozens of available accessories such as:
 Nikon WT-4A Wireless Transmitter for WLAN. Third-party solutions available.
 Nikon ML-L3 Wireless (Infrared) remote control or third-party solutions.
 Nikon GP-1 GPS Unit for direct GPS geotagging. Third-party solutions partly with 3-axis compass, data-logger, bluetooth and support for indoor use are available from Solmeta, Dawn, Easytag, Foolography, Gisteq and Phottix. See comparisons/reviews.
 Nikon MB-D11 Multi Power Battery grip or third-party solutions.
 Nikon CF-DC3 Soft Case.
 Various Nikon Speedlight or third-party flash units. Also working as commander for Nikon Creative Lighting System wireless (slave) flash.
 Third-party radio (wireless) flash control triggers are partly supporting i-TTL, but do not support the Nikon Creative Lighting System (CLS). See reviews.
 Tethered shooting with Nikon Camera Control Pro 2, Adobe Lightroom 3   or other partly free products including apps.
 Other accessories from Nikon and third parties, including protective cases and bags, eyepiece adapters and correction lenses, and underwater housings.

Reception

Reviews
Since its release, the D7000 has received many favorable reviews, with some commenting that the D7000 is a viable alternative to the more expensive D300S and an upgrade over the D90. Digital Photography Review awarded the camera an overall score of 80%, praising its feature set and image quality. The D7000 received four out of five stars and the Editor's choice award in CNET's review.

DxO Labs awarded its sensor an overall score of 80, above much more expensive competitors. The main point of criticism by reviewers is the small buffer which limits the number of shots in burst mode especially when shooting RAW.

There are image comparisons with many cameras at all ISO speeds in JPEG and RAW.

Matrix Metering II and detected faces
The 3D Color Matrix Metering II tends to overexpose minor parts of the image (e.g. sky or bright back-lights) if it detects faces near the image center that are darker (e.g. in shadow) than these minor parts. This feature is sometimes surprising due to reliable scene recognition and face detection (including side-view of faces) of the new high-resolution sensor, even if there are only strangers (in the dark) near the image center.

If not wanted, the metering can be changed with exposure compensation, two-point (average) metering, metering on the bright lights or use of center-weighted or spot metering, fill flash or RAW images. Increasing the dynamic range by use of Active D-Lighting or reducing the contrast settings (the default contrast is higher compared to previous Nikon DSLRs) aids when shooting JPEGs. After taking the image, contrast and brightness can easily be changed in camera.

User response
The D7000 was very much anticipated by Nikon consumers. The hype around its release made it very hard to find during the first months on the market. Supplies of this camera were also limited after the destruction of some Nikon manufacturing facilities in Thailand by the flooding in October 2011.
Many users have complained about back-focus problems on the D7000, as well as dust and oil spots on early production models

Firmware hacks
Several hacks have been published by Simon Pilgrim on Nikon Hacker internet forum and Vitaliy Kiselev on his personal website. Nikon Hacker has several people working on the hacks. The published hacks, among few others, include removing the time limit for video recording, clean HDMI and LCD on LiveView, disabling automatic hot-pixel removal (also known as Nikon Star Eater) and higher data rate for video recording. Several other hacks are under development but not yet published.

June 2013 Simon Pilgrim was able to enable RAW video recording but the frame rate (roughly 1.5 frames per second) is not high enough to be useful. The hack is not yet published.

References

External links

 Nikon D7000 – Nikon global website 
 Digitutor Nikon D7000 Nikon (needs Adobe Flash)
 Nikon D7000 Manual Nikon
 Nikon D7000 Review – Digital Photography Review website

D7000
D7000
Live-preview digital cameras
Cameras introduced in 2010